Ford: The Man and the Machine is a 1987 Canadian-American television film directed by Allan Eastman and starring Cliff Robertson as Henry Ford.  It is based on Robert Lacey's biography about Ford.  The film won three Gemini Awards for Best Dramatic Miniseries, Best Production Design or Art Direction and Best Costume Design and was nominated for three others for Best Supporting Actor (R. H. Thomson), Best Supporting Actress (Heather Thomas) and Best Sound.

Cast
Cliff Robertson as Henry Ford
Hope Lange as Clara Ford
Heather Thomas as Evangeline Cote
R. H. Thomson as Edsel Ford
Chas Lawther as Connors
Michael Ironside as Harry Bennett

References

External links
 
 

1987 television films
1987 films
English-language Canadian films
American biographical drama films
American drama television films
Canadian biographical drama films
Canadian drama television films
Films directed by Allan Eastman
1980s American films
1980s Canadian films